Pseudosphex consobrina is a moth of the subfamily Arctiinae. It was described by Francis Walker in 1856. It is found in the Amazon region.

References

Pseudosphex
Moths described in 1856